Ana Elena de la Portilla (born 6 August 1954) is a Mexican former breaststroke swimmer. She competed at the 1968 Summer Olympics and the 1972 Summer Olympics.

References

External links
 

1954 births
Living people
Mexican female breaststroke swimmers
Olympic swimmers of Mexico
Swimmers at the 1968 Summer Olympics
Swimmers at the 1972 Summer Olympics
Swimmers from Mexico City
Central American and Caribbean Games silver medalists for Mexico
Central American and Caribbean Games medalists in swimming
Competitors at the 1970 Central American and Caribbean Games
20th-century Mexican women
21st-century Mexican women